Diana Ramos is an American obstetrician and gynecologist who was appointed to serve as the surgeon general of California by Governor Gavin Newsom.

Education 
Ramos earned a bachelor's degree and Doctor of Medicine from the University of Southern California. She also earned a Master of public health from the University of California, Los Angeles and a Master of Business Administration from the University of California, Irvine.

Career 
Ramos serves as a health administrator at the California Department of Public Health's Center for Healthy Communities. She is also an adjunct associate clinical professor at the Keck School of Medicine of USC. In 2019, she became president of the Orange County Medical Association.

References 

Living people
American physicians
Physicians from California
University of Southern California alumni
Keck School of Medicine of USC alumni
Keck School of Medicine of USC faculty
University of California, Los Angeles alumni
University of California, Irvine alumni
People from Laguna Beach, California
Year of birth missing (living people)